The Vympel R-37 (NATO reporting name: AA-13 "Axehead") is a Russian hypersonic air-to-air missile with very long range. The missile and its variants also had the names K-37, izdeliye 610 and RVV-BD (Ракета Воздух-Воздух Большой Дальности (Raketa Vozduh-Vozduh Bolshoy Dalnosti), "Long range air-to-air missile"), and the NATO codenames "Axehead" and "Andi". It was developed from the R-33.

It is designed to shoot down tankers, AWACS and other C4ISTAR aircraft while keeping the launch platform out of range of any fighters that might be protecting the target.

According to Janes there are two variants, the R-37 and the R-37M; the latter conceived as having a jettisonable rocket booster that increases the range to "300–400 km" (160–220 nm).

Design
The R-37 was developed from the R-33. For compatibility with aircraft that did not have the MiG-31's sophisticated radar, the semi-active seeker was replaced with a variant of the Agat 9B-1388 active seeker. Similarly, folding tail controls allow semi-conformal carriage on planes that are not as big as the MiG-31.

Mid-body strakes enhance lift hence increases range.

The R-37M designation has since been used for a modernized variant of the missile, also known as RVV-BD (Raketa Vozduh-Vozduh Bolyshoy Dalnosty, or Long-Range Air-to-Air Missile). R-37M's range exceeds 200 km, and it is capable of hypersonic speed (~Mach 5) in the final stage of its flight. It will be carried by the modernized MiG-31BM interceptors and Su-35S and Su-57 multirole fighters. It is not known whether the long-range air-to-air missile for the Su-57, designated as Izdeliye 810, is a derivative of the R-37M.

The missile can attack targets at altitudes of 15–25,000 meters, guided semi-actively or actively through the Agat 9B-1388 system.

History
The missile was designed in the early 1980s and first flown in 1989. However, the program appears to have been dropped around 1998 on grounds of cost.

Work on the missile appears to have restarted in late 2006, as part of the MiG-31BM program to update the Foxhound with a new radar and ground attack capability.

In 2018, the R-37M had finished its operational validation tests.

On October 19, 2022, Russian, and subsequently Indian media claimed that the Su 57
stealth fighter shot down a Ukrainian Su 27 using the R-37M missile.

Zvezda TV reports have recorded the Su-35 carrying the R-37, apparently as part of an air combat loadout. In this configuration, the craft carries two R-73s in the central wing pylon, two R-77s slung underneath the engine nacelles, and two R-37s on the hardpoints between the engines, with an option to carry a few more missiles, such as a Kh-31 anti-radar missile.

Operational history
The R-37M has, since October 2022, been the main threat against the Ukrainian Air Force. The Ukrainian Air Force lacks fire and forget missiles. They relied on the R-27 missiles, both the R-27ER and R-27ET, the R-27ET's range is 60 miles. The Ukrainian pilot must illuminate the Russian aircraft with their radar to guide the missile to the target. Russian pilots firing active radar, fire and forget, R-77 give the Russian pilots the ability to launch their missiles and then take evasive action. Ukrainian pilots were forced to "exploit ground clutter and terrain-masking to get close enough to fire before being engaged".

A report by the Royal United Services Institute states that in October some six R-37Ms were being fired at the Ukrainian Air Force a day. The Su-35S is also used as a carrier for the R-37M. Four MiG-31 were also deployed to Crimea.

In August 2022, Russian forces maintained a Combat Air Patrol of either a pair of Su-35S or MiG-31s on station to shoot down Ukrainian aircraft. Since Ukrainian forces launched a counteroffensive in August they have lost "four MiG-29s, six Su-25s, a Su-24, and one Su-27". The Royal United Services Institute has credited most of the kills to the R-37M writing: “The VKS has been firing up to six R-37Ms per day during October. The extremely high speed of the weapon, coupled with very long effective range and a seeker designed for engaging low-altitude targets, makes it particularly difficult to evade.”

On 13 February 2023, Ukraine obtained wreckage of a spent R-37M. This has been handed over to UK intelligence for analysis.

According to a Russian source, the missile is carried by the Su-35S, the Su-57 fighters and the Mig-31BM interceptors.

Similar weapons
 AIM-54 Phoenix
 AIM-152 AAAM
 AIM-260 JATM
 KS-172
 PL-21
 Long-Range Engagement Weapon
 Meteor (missile)
 Astra Mark 3

References

External links
 R37 Vympel MKB 
 R-37 at airwar.ru

Air-to-air missiles of Russia
Air-to-air missiles of the Soviet Union
Cold War air-to-air missiles of the Soviet Union
Vympel NPO products
Military equipment introduced in the 2010s